Centene Corporation is a publicly traded managed care company based in St. Louis, Missouri. It serves as an intermediary for government-sponsored and privately insured health care programs. Centene ranked No. 26 on the 2021  Fortune 500.

History
Centene was founded by Elizabeth Brinn as the Managed Health Services in Milwaukee, Wisconsin in 1984. After the death of Brinn, the non-profit organization was sold to investors, with the proceeds going to the Betty Brinn Foundation, which subsequently became a major shareholder in Centene. In 1996, Michael F. Neidorff joined the company as chief executive.

Centene went public in December 2001. In 2006, the firm acquired US Script, a pharmacy benefits manager. The company later merged US Script with subsidiaries to form its Envolve divisions. In 2011, the firm formed Centurion, a provider of correctional health care services, as a joint venture with MHM Services. In 2018, it acquired MHM Services, including its stake in Centurion. Centene began offering state-run Medicaid programs through Affordable Care Act exchanges in 2014.

On July 2, 2015, Centene announced it would acquire Health Net. In March 2016, it finalized its acquisition  On September 12, 2017, it announced that it would acquire Fidelis Care, a nonprofit insurer in New York, for US$3.75 billion. In March 2019, it announced plans to acquire WellCare for US$17.3 billion. On January 4, 2021, it was announced that it would acquire Magellan Health for $2.2 billion. On January 4, 2022, the acquisition was completed.

In the United Kingdom, Centene began to acquire local healthcare services in 2017. In 2019, Centene, through its subsidiary MH Services, took a 40% stake in Circle Health, as part of a deal which created a national network of over 50 private hospitals. In early 2021, Operose Health, a UK subsidiary of Centene, took over a group of London practices, AT Medics.

In May 2022, Centene announced that they have divested two pharmacy organisations as the company exits the pharmacy benefit management business. Centene divested Mangellan Rx and PANTHERx Rare for a total of $2.8 billion.

Business segments 
The main lines of Centene include:

 Medicaid
 ACA health insurance marketplace
 Medicare
 Tricare
 Correctional healthcare

Leadership 
In June 2021, an article in the Ohio Capital Journal reported that CEO Michael Neidorff was the highest paid healthcare executive in the United States in 2020, earning nearly $25 million.

In December 2021, Politan Capital Management took a $900 million stake in Centene. Following the agreement, CEO Michael Neidorff announced plans to retire by the end of 2022.

In March 2022, Sarah London was named chief executive officer of the company, replacing Neidorff.

Controversies
In 2014, Fox News alleged that Superior HealthPlan of Texas denied coverage of an infant's surgery for brain cancer at Texas Children's Hospital. Superior HealthPlan is a joint-venture of Centene and Community Health Centers Network LP, which provides services for Medicaid recipients. The article reported that Superior HealthPlan had previously paid healthcare claims for the infant at the hospital, although Superior HealthPlan stated that it did not cover procedures at the facility. Three days after the article was published, Superior HealthPlan reversed its decision and covered the surgery.

In January 2018, a class action lawsuit accused Centene's Ambetter marketplace healthcare plans of misleading enrollees about plan benefits. According to the lawsuit, people who bought Centene's plans had difficulty finding medical providers that accepted patients covered under Centene's policies.

In December 2018, Centene was sued by two pension funds alleging that Centene's acquisition of Health Net resulted in damages to Centene and exposed the company to potential liability. The suit also alleged that Centene concealed that Health Net owed approximately $1B in past tax liabilities to California and was under investigation for Medicare fraud at the time of the acquisition.

In 2022 Operose Health had almost 600,000 NHS patients and was  the largest supplier of GP services to the NHS.  It was accused of putting patients at risk by prioritising profit, specifically by hiring physician associates, because they were cheaper than GPs.  At Operose practices the average number of full time equivalent GPs per patients is about half the average in English practices. Sir Sam Everington said he was worried to see physician associates saying they were not receiving the supervision they needed. The practice had a backlog of thousands of medical test results and hospital letters on their computer systems.  Operose said 97% of its practices were rated "good" or "outstanding" by the Care Quality Commission.

Settlements 
In April 2021, Health Net Federal Services, a subsidiary of Centene, agreed to pay $97M to settle allegations that it had duplicated or inflated claims submitted to the Department of Veterans Affairs.

Between June 2021 and January 2022, Centene agreed to settlements with several states on behalf of their subsidiary, Envolve, a pharmacy benefit manager, including Ohio, Mississippi, Illinois, Arkansas, and New Hampshire to resolve allegations of overpayments to the PBM from the states' Medicaid programs. The settlements have totaled over $191 million.

In December 2021, Centene agreed to pay $27.6M to Kansas to settle allegations that it had failed to disclose discounts and used other strategies to obtain more profit from Kansas' Medicaid program.

In September of 2022, Centene Corporation will pay more than $14 million to Massachusetts's to resolve claims that it overcharged the state Medicaid program, MassHealth, millions of dollars for pharmacy benefits and services provided by subsidiary companies.

See also
List of United States insurance companies
List of S&P 500 companies
Health insurance in the United States
Companies listed on the New York Stock Exchange (C)

References

External links 
 

 
Medicare and Medicaid (United States)
Companies listed on the New York Stock Exchange
Companies based in St. Louis
Pharmacy benefit management companies based in the United States
Health care companies based in Missouri
Health care companies established in 1984
Financial services companies established in 1984
American companies established in 1984
1984 establishments in Wisconsin
2001 initial public offerings
Health insurance companies of the United States